The following is a list of radio stations in the Canadian province of Alberta, .

Radio stations

See also 
 Lists of radio stations in North and Central America

External links
Canadian Communications Foundation - History of Radio stations in the Province of Alberta

Alberta
Radio stations